Cottonwood Lake is a lake in South Dakota, in the United States.

The lake was so named on account of the cottonwood trees which grew there.

See also
List of lakes in South Dakota

References

Lakes of South Dakota
Lakes of Clark County, South Dakota